The Russian Premier League (RPL; ; РПЛ), also written as Russian Premier Liga, is the top division professional association football league in Russia. It was established at the end of 2001 as the Russian Football Premier League (RFPL; ; РФПЛ) and was rebranded with its current name in 2018. From 1992 through 2001, the top level of the Russian football league system was the Russian Football Championship (Chempionat Rossii po Futbolu).

There are 16 teams in the competition. As of the 2021/22 season, the league had two Champions League qualifying spots for the league winners and league runners-up, and two spots in the UEFA Conference League were allocated to the third- and fourth-placed teams. However, those have all been suspended due to Russia's invasion of Ukraine, along with the national team's participation in international competitions. The last two teams are relegated to the Russian First League at the end of the season, while the 13th and 14th placed teams compete against the National League's 4th and 3rd teams respectively in a two-legged playoff.

The Russian Premier League succeeded the Top Division including history and records. The Top Division was run by the Professional Football League of Russia. Since July 2022, the league is currently called Mir Russian Premier League, also written as Mir Russian Premier Liga (after the Mir payment system), for sponsorship reasons.

Since the introduction of the Russian Premier League in 2002, Zenit Saint Petersburg (8 times), CSKA Moscow (6 times), Lokomotiv Moscow (3 times), Rubin Kazan (2 times) and Spartak Moscow (1 time) have won the title. Zenit Saint Petersburg are the current champions winning the competition since 2018 until 2021  consecutively.

History
After the dissolution of the Soviet Union, starting in 1992, each former Soviet republic organized an independent national championship. In Russia, the six Russian teams who had played in the Soviet Top League in 1991 (CSKA Moscow, Spartak Moscow, Torpedo Moscow, Dynamo Moscow, Spartak Vladikavkaz, and Lokomotiv Moscow) were supplemented with 14 teams from lower divisions to form a 20-team Russian Top Division. The Top Division was divided into two groups to reduce the total number of matches. The number of teams in the Top Division was reduced to 18 in 1993 and 16 in 1994. Since then, the Russian Top Division (and the Premier League since 2002) has consisted of 16 teams, except for a short-lived experiment with having two more teams in 1996 and 1997.

Spartak Moscow won nine of the first ten titles. Spartak-Alania Vladikavkaz was the only team which managed to break Spartak's dominance, winning the top division title in 1995. Lokomotiv Moscow have won the title three times, and CSKA Moscow six times. In 2007, Zenit St. Petersburg won the title for the first time in their history in Russian professional football; they had also won a Soviet title in 1984. 2008 brought the rise of Rubin Kazan, a club entirely new to the Russian top flight, as it had never competed in the Soviet Top League.

In preparation for the 2018–19 season, it was decided to hold a rebranding in which a new logo was presented.

As a result of the Russia's invasion of Ukraine, all Russian club and national teams were banned from European competition indefinitely. Spartak Moscow, who were competing in the UEFA Europa League and were the only Russian club team remaining in European competition at the time, were disqualified from their tie against RB Leipzig, who advanced on a walkover.

Competition

Teams in the Russian Premier League play each other twice, once at home and once away, for a total of 30 matches. Three points are awarded for a win, one for a draw, and none for a loss. If teams are level on points, the tie-breakers are the number of wins, then the goal difference, followed by several other factors. If the teams are tied for the first position, the tie-breakers are the number of wins, then head-to-head results. If the teams tied for the first place cannot be separated by these tie-breakers, a championship play-off is ordered.

As of 2020–21 season, the champions qualify for the UEFA Champions League group stage. The runners-up qualifies for the Champions League third qualifying round. The third and fourth-place teams qualify for the UEFA Europa Conference League. If the winner of Russian Cup ends in first or second on the championship in same season, then the third-place team qualifies to UEFA Europa League group stage, while fourth and fifth-place teams qualify for the UEFA Europa Conference League instead. The bottom two teams are relegated to the First League. Starting on the 2020–21 season the teams ranked in 13th and 14th-place play a two legs relegation play-off against 4th and 3rd-place team from National League. The two winners of this play-off secures the right to play in Premier League in following season.

Unlike most other European football leagues, the league traditionally used to run in summer, from March to November, to avoid playing games in the cold and snowy weather in winter. This was altered ahead of the 2012–13 season, with the league planning to run the season from autumn to spring. The transitional season of the competition began in early 2011 and continued until summer of 2012. After the 16 Premier League teams played each other twice over the course of the 2011 calendar year, they were split into two groups of eight, and the teams played other teams in their groups two more times for a total of 44 games (30 in 2011 and 14 in 2012). Those two groups were contested in spring 2012, with the top eight clubs playing for the title and European places. The other sides vied to avoid relegation: the bottom two went down while the next two played off against the sides third and fourth in the National Football League, with the two losers being relegated (or denied promotion). Under the current autumn-spring calendar, the league takes a three-month winter break from mid-December until mid-March. Merging the calendar with other UEFA leagues however, has increased numbers of games in winter. This has resulted in the Russian Far East and Siberian teams being forced to play more home games in hostile weather conditions which affected the Premier League when SKA Khabarovsk took part.

Youth championship
The Youth championship, also known as Youth teams championship, Reserve team tournament or Reserves tournament, full name Youth football championship of Russia among teams of clubs of the Premier League, is a league that runs in parallel to the Russian Premier League and includes the youth or reserve teams of the Russian Premier League teams. The number of players a team can have on the pitch at a time that are over 21 years of age or without a Russian citizenship is limited. 16 teams participate in the league. Matches are commonly played a day before the match of the senior teams of the respective teams. All of the Russian Premier League teams are obliged to have a youth team that would participate in the Youth championship. The teams that are promoted from the National Football League and do not have a youth team must create one. The teams in the league are not relegated based on their final league position, but on the league position of their respective clubs' senior teams.

It has to be noted however that some Premier League clubs have three teams. Apart from the senior team and the team that plays in the Youth championship a team might have another senior team that plays in a lower division of Russian football and serves as the farm team for the main team. An example is Krasnodar-2, playing in the Russian First League.

Reserves tournament champions (2001–2007) 

2001: Rotor Volgograd
2002: Dynamo Moscow
2003: Dynamo Moscow
2004: Terek Grozny
2005: CSKA Moscow
2006: Spartak Moscow
2007: Spartak Moscow

Youth championship winners (since 2008) 
2008: Spartak Moscow
2009: Zenit Saint Petersburg
2010: Spartak Moscow
2011: Lokomotiv Moscow
2012: Dynamo Moscow
2012–13: Spartak Moscow
2013–14: Dynamo Moscow
2014–15: Dynamo Moscow
2015–16: Lokomotiv Moscow
2016–17: Spartak Moscow
2017–18: Krasnodar
2018–19: CSKA Moscow
2019–20: Dynamo Moscow
2020–21: CSKA Moscow
2021–22: CSKA Moscow

UEFA club rankings 
Russia are currently twenty-third in the UEFA coefficient rankings. The following are the best ranked Russian teams in Europe as of December 2020:

Current clubs

The following teams are competing in the 2022–23 season:

Champions and top scorers

Performance by club

Russian all-time champions

Seasons of Russian Premier League and Russian Football Championship (1992-2022)

A total of 50 teams had competed in at least one season at the top division. Spartak Moscow, CSKA Moscow and Lokomotiv Moscow are the only teams to have played in the top division in every season since the league's inception at 1992. The teams in bold participate in the 2022–23 Premier League.

All-time table

As of the end of the 2017–18 season. Teams in bold compete in 2018–19 Premier League.

Notes
For clubs that have been renamed, their name at the time of their most recent season in the Russian League is given. The current members are listed in bold.
Includes championship play-offs, does not include relegation play-offs.
For the purposes of this table, each win is worth 3 points. The three-point system was adopted in 1995.
Terek were deducted 6 points in 2005.
KAMAZ-Chally were deducted 6 points in 1997.

Player records

Most appearances
As of 19 March 2023

Most goals
As of 18 March 2023

Champions (players)

9-time
 Dmitri Ananko (1992–94), (1996–01)

Media coverage

2020–21 and 2021–22

Russia and CIS

Worldwide (excluding Russia, CIS, and China) 
All 240 matches are aired live globally on YouTube with a required subscription. There will be two membership levels for the viewers outside Russia, CIS, and China. The first level includes two matches with English commentary each matchday and will cost a monthly fee of $2.99. The second level, for $4.99 a month, gives subscribers access to all eight matches in Russian and two matches with English commentary as well. In 2018–19 season, YouTube broadcast four live matches per week for free (in matchweek 30, aired all last eight matches). From 2020 to 2021, YouTube also broadcast the FTA coverage of Super Cup before airing the league.

See also
Football in Russia
Russian Cup
Soviet Top League
List of attendance figures at domestic professional sports leagues
List of foreign Russian Premier League players

Notes

References

External links

 
 History and statictics

 
1
Russia
1992 establishments in Russia
Sports leagues established in 1992
National championships in Russia
Sports leagues in Russia
Professional sports leagues in Russia